Rajowal is a village in Nurmahal. Nurmahal is a sub tehsil in the city Jalandhar of Indian state of Punjab.

About
Rajowal is almost 9 km from Nurmahal.  The nearest railway station to Rajowal is Nurmahal Railway station. Another village Rajowal Nau of Muslim Kambohs is located in Punjab of Pakistan.

Post code & STD code
Rajowal's Post office is Kot Badal Khan whose code is 144039. The village's  STD code is 01826.

See also
 Rajowal Nau

References

  Official website of Punjab Govt. with Rajowal's details

Villages in Jalandhar district